Ingmar Bergman (14 July 1918 – 30 July 2007) was a Swedish director, writer, and producer who worked in film, television, theatre and radio. He is recognized as one of the most accomplished and influential filmmakers of all time, and is well known for films such as The Seventh Seal (1957), Wild Strawberries (1957), Persona (1966), Cries and Whispers (1972), and Fanny and Alexander (1982).

Bergman directed over sixty films and documentaries for cinematic release and for television, most of which he also wrote. He also directed over 170 plays. From 1953, he forged a powerful creative partnership with his full-time cinematographer Sven Nykvist. Among his company of actors were Harriet and Bibi Andersson, Liv Ullmann, Gunnar Björnstrand, Erland Josephson, Ingrid Thulin and Max von Sydow. Most of his films were set in Sweden, and numerous films from Through a Glass Darkly (1961) onward were filmed on the island of Fårö. His work often deals with death, illness, faith, betrayal, bleakness and insanity.

Philip French referred to Bergman as among the greatest artists of the 20th century. Mick LaSalle compared Bergman's significance in film to that of Virginia Woolf and James Joyce in literature.

List of accolades

Terrence Rafferty of The New York Times wrote that throughout the 1960s, when Bergman "was considered pretty much the last word in cinematic profundity, his every tic was scrupulously pored over, analyzed, elaborated in ingenious arguments about identity, the nature of film, the fate of the artist in the modern world and so on." Many filmmakers have praised Bergman and some have also cited his work as an influence on their own:
 Andrei Tarkovsky held Bergman in very high regard, noting him and Robert Bresson as his two favourite filmmakers, stating: "I am only interested in the views of two people: one is called Bresson and one called Bergman." Such was Bergman's influence, Tarkovsky's last film was made in Sweden with Sven Nykvist, Bergman's longtime cinematographer, and several of Bergman's favoured actors including Erland Josephson. Bergman likewise had great respect for Tarkovsky, stating: "Tarkovsky for me is the greatest director."
 Alejandro González Iñárritu while entering the Berg-man compound (Bergman's house) on the remote island of Fårö for a documentary called Trespassing Bergman stated "If cinema was a religion, this would be Mecca, the Vatican. This is the center of it all."
 Bertrand Tavernier stated: "Bergman was the first to bring metaphysics — religion, death, existentialism — to the screen ... but the best of Bergman is the way he speaks of women, of the relationship between men and women. He’s like a miner digging in search of purity."
 Nuri Bilge Ceylan
 Steven Soderbergh
 David Lynch
 Wes Craven
 Pedro Almodóvar
 Jean-Luc Godard
 Robert Altman
 Adoor Gopalakrishnan
 Olivier Assayas
 Francis Ford Coppola stated: "My all-time favorite because he embodies passion, emotion and has warmth."
 Guillermo del Toro said: "Bergman as a fabulist — my favorite — is absolutely mesmerizing."
 Asghar Farhadi
 Todd Field stated: "He was our tunnel man building the aqueducts of our cinematic collective unconscious."
 Federico Fellini said: "I have a profound admiration for him (Bergman) and for his work, even though I haven’t seen all of his films. First of all, he is a master of his métier. Secondly, he is able to make things mysterious, compelling, colorful and, at times, repulsive."
 Woody Allen has referred to Bergman as "probably the greatest film artist, all things considered, since the invention of the motion picture camera". He said, "For me it was Wild Strawberries. Then The Seventh Seal and The Magician. That whole group of films that came out then told us that Bergman was a magical filmmaker. There had never been anything like it, this combination of intellectual artist and film technician. His technique was sensational." Allen has credited Bergman with inventing "a film vocabulary that suited what he wanted to say, that had never really been done before. He'd put the camera on one person's face close and leave it there, and just leave it there and leave it there. It was the opposite of what you learned to do in film school, but it was enormously effective and entertaining."
 Krzysztof Kieślowski stated: "This man is one of the few film directors — perhaps the only one in the world — to have said as much about human nature as Dostoyevsky or Camus."
 Stanley Kubrick stated: "I believe Ingmar Bergman, Vittorio De Sica and Federico Fellini are the only three filmmakers in the world who are not just artistic opportunists. By this I mean they don't just sit and wait for a good story to come along and then make it. They have a point of view which is expressed over and over and over again in their films, and they themselves write or have original material written for them." Kubrick praised Bergman as "The Greatest film-maker, unsurpassed by anyone in the creation of mood and atmosphere, the subtlety of performance, the avoidance of the obvious, the truthfulness and completeness of characterization." 
 Ang Lee stated: "For me the filmmaker Bergman is the greatest performer of all...", "He (Bergman) is like God to me. I will take inspiration. I won’t dare to imitate"
 François Ozon
 Park Chan-wook
 Éric Rohmer stated: "The Seventh Seal is the most beautiful film ever."
 Marjane Satrapi
 Mamoru Oshii
 Paul Schrader stated: "I would not have made any of my films or written scripts such as Taxi Driver had it not been for Ingmar Bergman. What he has left is a legacy greater than any other director. I think the extraordinary thing that Bergman will be remembered for, other than his body of work, was that he probably did more than anyone to make cinema a medium of personal and introspective value."
 Martin Scorsese said: "I guess I'd put it like this: if you were alive in the '50s and the '60s and of a certain age, a teenager on your way to becoming an adult, and you wanted to make films, I don't see how you couldn't be influenced by Bergman. You would have had to make a conscious effort, and even then, the influence would have snuck through."
 Steven Spielberg stated: "His love for the cinema almost gives me a guilty conscience."
 Satyajit Ray stated: "I have great admiration for Bergman...It's Bergman whom I continue to be fascinated by. I think he's remarkable. I envy his stock company, because given actors like that one could do extraordinary things."
 André Téchiné
 Liv Ullmann
Lars von Trier, in reference to having once sent Bergman a letter, jokingly said, "I have seen all his movies, he is a great source of inspiration to me. He was like a father to me. But he treated me in the same way he treated all his children. No interest whatsoever!"

Legacy accolades in popular culture

A Bergman-themed parody spoofs the allegory of cheating death (Bergman's The Seventh Seal) in the sketch comedy show Saturday Night Live season 1 (ep. 23, 24 July 1976). The sketch, titled "Swedish Movie", is somberly narrated in the third-person by a Swedish-speaking Death (Tom Schiller) with English subtitles scrolling. The baleful voice-over dialogue, revealed to be emanating from the apparition of Death personified, imposes upon dreamily preoccupied lovers Sven (Chevy Chase) and Inger (Louise Lasser) who send a not-so-silently jeering Death out for pizza.

Monty Python's The Meaning of Life includes a sketch based on The Seventh Seal in which middle-class weekenders at an isolated farmhouse are visited by The Grim Reaper.

A television spoof of Persona appeared in an episode of the Canadian comedy series SCTV in the late 1970s. SCTV later aired another Bergman parody, this time of Scenes From A Marriage that featured actor Martin Short portraying comedian Jerry Lewis as the star of a fictional Bergman film called Scenes From An Idiot's Marriage.

Bill & Ted's Bogus Journey includes a further spoof on the theme of playing games with Death from Bergman's The Seventh Seal. Bill and Ted are set to play a game with Death. Rather than chess, they play checkers. When Bill and Ted win, Death challenges them to a best of three match, wherein they play Battleship and other games from popular culture.

The Muppets franchise had a spoof of Bergman's style in a segment entitled "Silent Strawberries" from the TV special, The Muppets Go to the Movies.

In Season 2 Episode 2 of Welcome to Sweden, Jason Priestley asks to meet Ingmar Bergman.

Directed Academy Award performances
Bergman directed two Oscar nominated performances.

Awards and nominations

Academy Awards
In 1971, Bergman received the Irving G. Thalberg Memorial Award at the Academy Awards ceremony. Three of his films won the Academy Award for Best Foreign Language Film. The list of his nominations and awards follows:

BAFTA Awards

Berlin Film Festival
 Won: Golden Bear for Best Film, Wild Strawberries (Smultronstället), 1957
 Won: FIPRESCI Prize, Wild Strawberries, 1957
 Nominated: Golden Bear for Best Film, Through a Glass Darkly (Såsom i en spegel), 1961
 Won: OCIC Prize, Through a Glass Darkly, 1961

Cannes Film Festival

Venice Film Festival

Cesar Awards

Bodil Award

Golden Globe Awards

Nastro d'Argento

Guldbagge Awards

Other awards and honours
 Foreign Honorary Member of the American Academy of Arts and Sciences, 1961
 Erasmus Prize, 1965
 The Dorothy and Lillian Gish Prize, 1995
 Career Golden Lion at Venice Film Festival, 1971
 Goethe Prize, 1976
 Commandeur de la Légion d’honneur, 1985
 BAFTA Fellowship, 1988
 Japan Art Association's Praemium Imperiale, 1991
 On 6 April 2011, the Bank of Sweden announced that Bergman's portrait is featured on the new 200 kronor banknote, which was issued in 2015.

Exhibitions
 Ingmar Bergman.The Image Maker, Multimedia Art Museum, Moscow, 2012
 Ingmar Bergman: The Man Who Asked Hard Questions, Multimedia Art Museum, Moscow, 2012

Filmography

See also
 Cinema of Sweden
 List of film collaborations

References

Bibliography
 Bergman on Bergman: Interviews with Ingmar Bergman. By Stig Björkman, Torsten Manns, and Jonas Sima; translated by Paul Britten Austin. Simon & Schuster, New York. Swedish edition copyright 1970; English translation 1973.
 Filmmakers on filmmaking: the American Film Institute seminars on motion pictures and television (edited by Joseph McBride). Boston, Houghton Mifflin Co., 1983.
 Images: my life in film, Ingmar Bergman. Translated by Marianne Ruuth. New York, Arcade Pub., 1994, 
 
 The Magic Lantern, Ingmar Bergman. Translated by Joan Tate New York, Viking Press, 1988, 
 The Demons of Modernity: Ingmar Bergman and European Cinema, John Orr, Berghahn Books, 2014.

External links

 
 
 
 Ingmar Bergman Face to Face
 The Ingmar Bergman Foundation
 Ingmar Bergman all posters
 Bergmanorama: The magic works of Ingmar Bergman
 The Guardian/NFT interview with Liv Ullmann by Shane Danielson, 23 January 2001
 Xan Brooks reports on Bergman's interview for Reuters, The Guardian, 12 December 2001
 Bergman Week
 Regilexikon
 DVD Beaver's Director's Chair on Bergman, with links to DVD and Blu-ray comparisons of his major films

Bibliographies
 Ingmar Bergman Bibliography (via UC Berkeley)
 Ingmar Bergman Site
 Collection of interviews with Bergman

 

Ingmar Bergman
Bergman, Ingmar